Dream is an album by the Japanese new age musician Kitarō, featuring vocals by Jon Anderson, singer of the band Yes on three songs.

Track listing

Charts

References

External links
 Kitaro official website

Kitarō albums
1992 albums